Roald Nasgaard  (born October 14, 1941) is a champion of abstract art in Canada.

Career
Roald Nasgaard received his B.A. from the University of British Columbia (1965); M.A., University British Columbia (1967); and Doctor of Philosophy, at the New York University Institute of Fine Arts. He began his career as a lecturer and assistant professor at the University of Guelph (1971-1975), then served as the curator of contemporary art at the Art Gallery of Ontario (AGO), Toronto (1975-1978), chief curator (1978-1989), and deputy director and chief curator (1989-1993). In his role as chief curator, he oversaw the expansion of the gallery's permanent collection, as well as organizing many exhibitions, often of Canadian abstract art and important international exhibitions such as Gerhard Richter: Paintings (1988), Richter's first retrospective exhibition in North America, as well as working with Germano Celant on The European Iceberg: Creativity in Germany and Italy Today (1985). In 1993, he became senior curator of research (1993). He then served as chair of the department of art at Florida State University, Tallahassee (1995-2006), and as professor of art history, since 2006. He is now professor emeritus of that institution.

He was co-organizer of the programming of the Institute of Modern and Contemporary Art, Calgary, Canada; visiting lecturer, University of Guelph, and York University and visiting lecturer, adjunct professor at the University of Toronto. He was also a research fellow at the National Gallery of Canada Library and Archives (summer 2002).

His exhibition, The Urge to Abstraction, opened in, 2007 at the Varley Art Gallery of Markham, Unionville Ont. His traveling exhibition for the Varley Art Gallery, The Automatiste Revolution: Montreal 1941-1960 was exhibited at the Albright-Knox Gallery in Buffalo in 2009 and he co-curated The Plasticiens and Beyond: Montreal, 1955–1970 in 2013 at the Musée national des beaux-arts du Québec and the Varley Art Gallery. In 2016, he was one of the curators of Mystical Landscapes: Masterpieces from Monet, Van Gogh and more (AGO and Musée d'Orsay) and in 2017 curated Higher States: Lawren Harris and his American Contemporaries (McMichael Canadian Art Collection and the Glenbow Museum).

Selected publications
He has been the author of many exhibition catalogues, including, among others: Yves Gaucher: A Fifteen-Year Perspective (1979) (and an internet book on Gaucher for the Art Canada Institute); Structures for Behaviour: New Sculptures by Robert Morris, David Rabinowitch, Richard Serra and George Trakas (1978); and The Mystic North: Symbolist Landscape Painting in Northern Europe and North America, 1890-1940 (1984) which Artforum magazine called a "sweeping survey of Symbolist landscape painting in Northern Europe and North America", adding the catalogue was "fine". It said that Nasgaard had located a "European ancestry for early Modern Canadian painting". Besides receiving scholarly praise, the catalogue received popular approval. Goodreads rated the book with a full five stars.

In 2001, the Florida State University Museum of Fine Arts, published his Pleasures of Sight and States of Being: Radical Abstract Painting Since 1990. In 2007, Douglas & McIntyre published his book Abstract Painting in Canada: A History which is considered a substantial offering. In 2009, he co-wrote The Automatiste Revolution: Montreal 1941-1960 and in 2013, co-wrote The Plasticiens and Beyond: Montreal, 1955–1970. In 2017, Goose Lane Editions and the McMichael Canadian Art Collection published his co-publication Higher States: Lawren Harris and His American Contemporaries (Fredericton, New Brunswick and Kleinburg, Ontario), reviewed favorably, with reservations by a peer in the College Art Association in 2019. In the World Cataloguing Identities, Dr. Nasgaard's books have 2,661 library holdings.

Awards and honours
Dr. Nasgaard won an Ontario Art Galleries Association Curatorial Writing Award in 1991 for his essay in Individualités: 14 Contemporary Artists from France. He has held several Canada Council fellowships (1967-1968), (1970-1971) and grants as well as a Research Fellowship at the National Gallery of Canada Library and Archives (2002) and a Cornerstone (AHPEG) Grant, FSU (2006-2007). He was made an Officer of the Order of Canada in 2012. He also has been a member of the Toronto Public Art Commission, and of the Gershon Iskowitz Foundation.

References

1941 births
Canadian art curators
Canadian art historians
Officers of the Order of Canada
University of British Columbia alumni
New York University Institute of Fine Arts alumni
Living people
Danish emigrants to Canada